Thomas Ross Bond (September 16, 1926 – September 24, 2005) was an American actor, director, producer and writer. He was best known for his work as a child actor for two nonconsecutive periods in Our Gang (Little Rascals) comedies (first as "Tommy" and later as "Butch"). Also, he is noted for being the first actor to appear onscreen as "Superman's pal" Jimmy Olsen, having portrayed the character in the film serials Superman (1948) and Atom Man vs. Superman (1950).

Biography

Early years and Our Gang
Born in Dallas, Texas, Bond got his start in 1931 at the age of 4 when a talent scout for Hal Roach studios approached him as he was leaving a Dallas cinema.

Bond was hired at Hal Roach Studios for the Our Gang series in the summer of 1931 to begin work that upcoming fall, at around the same time as George "Spanky" McFarland was hired. Bond worked in Our Gang for three years, alternately appearing as a supporting character and a background actor. His speaking roles increased by 1934, including his most substantive role up to that point, as the gang's band conductor in Mike Fright. In late 1934, Bond left the series and returned to public school, still earning periodic bit parts in Hollywood productions. 
 
After leaving the gang for the first time, Bond also worked as a voice actor, most notably in several of Tex Avery's Merrie Melodies cartoons for Warner Bros. His best known voice role was as the speaking voice of "Owl Jolson" in Tex Avery's 1936 Merrie Melodies cartoon, I Love to Singa.

Bond returned to Our Gang on a recurring basis late in 1936, when Roach hired him to play "Butch", the neighborhood bully. In one short, his mother called him "Tommy", apparently indicating that "Butch" was a nickname. Bond's first short as Butch was Glove Taps. Besides filling the role of the archetypal Our Gang bully, the Butch character also regularly competed with meek Alfalfa (Carl Switzer) for the affections of his sweetheart Darla (Darla Hood). While in Our Gang, Bond appeared in a number of outside films, such as those featuring fellow Hal Roach Studios comedians Charley Chase and Laurel and Hardy.

As Butch, Bond remained with Our Gang an additional three years, staying with the series when it moved to Metro-Goldwyn-Mayer in 1938. His final Our Gang short, Bubbling Troubles, was released in 1940; Bond continued to work in other MGM productions following his departure from Our Gang. In total, Bond appeared in 27 Our Gang shorts – 13 as "Tommy" and 14 as "Butch".

Later years
After serving in the U.S. Navy during World War II, Bond returned to acting, and appeared in two Gas House Kids features alongside former on-screen rival Carl Switzer. In the late 1940s, Bond became the first actor to portray cub reporter Jimmy Olsen in two Superman film serials: Superman (1948) and Atom Man vs. Superman (1950). He also appeared as Joey Pepper in several installments of the Five Little Peppers serial.

In 1951, Bond graduated from college and quit acting, but remained in show business in the areas of television directing and production, and worked with individuals such as Norman Lear, George Schlatter, and many others. He worked at  KTTV in Los Angeles from the 1950s to the early 1970s. He then went to work for KFSN in Fresno from the early 1970s to 1991. Bond also worked as a production manager on Rowan & Martin's Laugh-In.

During the 1960s, Bond was an active member of Emmanuel Lutheran Church in North Hollywood where a number of his Hollywood friends and colleagues attended. Together, they were instrumental in the production and presentation of the annual Christmas Pageant presented on the grounds of Emmanuel's school Laurel Hall. The production, which involved a cast of several hundred, a chariot and horses, numerous other animals and professional Hollywood sets and lighting, was presented each year during the Christmas season for several weeks leading up to Christmas. Grandstand style bleachers were installed that seated about 1000 guests. Highlights of the pageant included a horse-driven chariot and Roman soldiers on horseback riding through the gates of Bethlehem to proclaim the census requiring Jews to register in their hometowns. Bond was instrumental in arranging for the production to be filmed and aired on Metromedia owned Channel 11, KTTV in about 1965.

In 1972, he appeared as a guest on I've Got a Secret while working as a production assistant on the show. Bond retired from television in 1991. In his latter years he lived in the Fresno and Madera Ranchos area, and served as a spokesman for a number of Our Gang-related materials. Bond published his autobiography, Darn Right It's Butch: Memories of Our Gang/The Little Rascals, with the help of Fresno teacher, film historian and co-author Ron Genini, in 1994. Tommy's son, Thomas R. Bond II "Butch, Jr.", who is a film and television producer, worked with his father in their family production company, Biograph Company. The senior Bond also hosted The Rascals, a documentary on the life and times of the Little Rascals.

Throughout his lifetime, Bond appeared in 73 films, was a charter member of the Screen Actors Guild, joining in 1937, and worked with many Hollywood stars in the years of 1933 to 1951, including James Stewart, Eleanor Powell, Ray Bolger, Frank Morgan, and Eddie Cantor among many others.

Death
Bond died on September 24, 2005, at age 79 due to complications from heart disease in Northridge, California. He is buried at U.S. Veterans Riverside National Cemetery in Riverside, California.

Filmography

References

Books
Bond, Tommy, w. Genini, Ron (1994). Darn Right It's Butch: Memories of Our Gang/The Little Rascals. Delaware: Morgan Press. .

Further reading
 Dye, David. Child and Youth Actors: Filmography of Their Entire Careers, 1914-1985. Jefferson, NC: McFarland & Co., 1988, pp. 23–24.
 Holmstrom, John. The Moving Picture Boy: An International Encyclopaedia from 1895 to 1995, Norwich, Michael Russell, 1996, pp. 153.

External links
 
 
 Biography on filmsofthegoldenage.com
 American Mutoscope and Biograph Co.
 

1926 births
2005 deaths
20th-century American male actors
American male child actors
American male comedy actors
American male film actors
American male voice actors
American television directors
Burials at Riverside National Cemetery
Hal Roach Studios actors
Male actors from Dallas
Our Gang
United States Navy personnel of World War II
Warner Bros. Cartoons voice actors